Just a Boys' Game is a 1979 Play for Today written by Peter McDougall and directed by John Mackenzie.

It features Frankie Miller, Gregor Fisher, Ken Hutchison, Hector Nicol, Jean Taylor Smith, Katherine Stark, Barry Malone, Michael Malone and band The Cuban Heels.

The plot revolves around the life of Jake McQuillan who lives in the shadow of his dying grandfather, who used to be Greenock's hardest man.

The play was filmed in and around Greenock, Drumchapel and Port Glasgow.

Frankie Miller's song Rules of the Game is featured over the closing credits.

Cast
Jake McQuillen	- Frankie Miller
Dancer Dunnichy - Ken Hutchison
Grannie - Jean Taylor Smith
Granda	- Hector Nicol
Tanza	- Gregor Fisher
Jane - Katherine Stark
Bella - Jan Wilson
Mental Dan	- Jim Byars
At the pub - Irene Sunters, Martin Cochrane

Critical reception
Screenonline wrote "stunningly photographed by Elmer Cossey and featured McDougall's most crackling dialogue and richest characterisations, all brilliantly evoked by a cast headed by blues singer Frankie Miller in a performance that melts the camera in its intensity."

References

External links

BBC television dramas
Play for Today
Scottish plays
Plays set in Scotland
1979 television films
1979 films
British television films
Greenock
Scots-language films
Scottish television films
Films directed by John Mackenzie (film director)
English-language Scottish films